Sublime is a 2007 psychological horror film directed by Tony Krantz and written by Erik Jendresen. It is the second straight-to-DVD "Raw Feed" horror film from Warner Home Video, released on March 13, 2007.  The film stars Tom Cavanagh, Kathleen York, Lawrence Hilton-Jacobs, and Katherine Cunningham-Eves.

Plot
George Grieves checks into the Mt. Abaddon Hospital for a routine procedure only to find horrors await him. Awakening from what was supposedly a colonoscopy, Grieves is told by hospital staff that due to confusion arising from similar patient names he was mistakenly given a sympathectomy to cure sweaty palms.

As the days tick by Mr. Grieves' post-operative experiences grow ever more bizarre until he finally realizes that he is caught inside a nightmare of his own creation and seems unable to escape or awaken back in the real world. He understands that something has gone wrong in his post-operative recovery which is keeping him trapped in this netherworld of manifestations of worst fears, but he understands neither what the problem is nor what he can do to awaken from it.

Eventually his condition is shown from his family's perspective, and it appears hopeless. The doctors explain that there was a complication during the colonoscopy, which created an air bubble in his bloodstream. The bubble eventually reached his brain and caused so much damage that he ended up in an apparently permanent vegetative state. He has been dead to the outside world for 10 months, and his family is being pressured to end all artificial means of life support.

Meanwhile, back inside his own mind, Grieves is in a desperate losing battle with his own manifested fears and decides that the only way out is to commit suicide in this dream-like state, hoping that it will cause his real body to expire and free him from the interminable torment he has had to endure. He manages to leap from a 7th-floor window onto the concrete below, and the final shot is of his real-world body lying in an empty hospital room where it flatlines, closing its eyelids in physical death.

Cast 
Tom Cavanagh as George Grieves 
Kathleen York as Jenny 
Katherine Cunningham-Eves as Zoe
Jeffrey Anderson-Gunter as P.J. 
Cas Anvar as Dr. Sharazi 
Paget Brewster  as Andrea 
David Clayton Rogers as Billy
Jordi Caballero as Friar Lazaro Mate
Sujata Day as Young Quechua Girl
Lilyan Chauvin as European Nurse 
Shanna Collins as Chloe 
Kyle Gallner as Ned 
Dan Gerrity as The Bald Man 
Michael Gregory as The Face 
Lawrence Hilton-Jacobs as Mandingo 
George Newbern as Frank / PVS Host 
Bruce Nozick as Ira 
Michelle Page as Rayven

Production
In June 2006, it was announced Tony Krantz, of the TV series 24 would make his directorial debut on Sublime the second film to be produced under Warner Bros. Home Entertainment label Raw Feed that Krantz had created with  Daniel Myrick and John Shiban. The film's budget was estimated at around $5 million.

Reception
The film garnered a 33% approval rating from 6 critics – a mixed to negative rating of 4.1 out of 10 – on the review-aggregate website Rotten Tomatoes.

References

External links

2007 direct-to-video films
2007 horror films
2000s psychological horror films
American drama films
American psychological horror films
2007 films
Films scored by Anthony Marinelli
Films produced by Daniel Myrick
Films about nightmares
Films set in hospitals
2000s English-language films
Films directed by Tony Krantz
2000s American films